Robert Dunbar Riggle (born February 5, 1944) is a former American football player who played for Atlanta Falcons of the National Football League (NFL). He played college football at Penn State University.

References

1944 births
Living people
People from Washington, Pennsylvania
Players of American football from Pennsylvania
American football defensive backs
Penn State Nittany Lions football players
Atlanta Falcons players